Anthony Amalfi (born 19 January 1967) is an Australian former cricketer. He played one first-class cricket match for Victoria in 1993.

See also
 List of Victoria first-class cricketers

References

External links
 

1967 births
Living people
Australian cricketers
Victoria cricketers
Cricketers from Melbourne